Moosomin 112J is an Indian reserve of the Moosomin First Nation in Saskatchewan. It is 23 kilometres southwest of Spiritwood.

References

Indian reserves in Saskatchewan